Spatial Statistics is an academic journal published by Elsevier about spatial statistics.
Its editor-in-chief is Alfred Stein;
its 2018 impact factor is 1.219.

References

Elsevier academic journals
Statistics journals
Geostatistics